Bob Griffin (born October 22, 1940) is a former American football coach. He served as the head football coach at Idaho State University from 1972 to 1975 and the University of Rhode Island from 1976 to 1992, compiling a career college football coaching record of 100–127–1. His 79 wins with the Rhode Island Rams are the most of any head coach in program history. Griffin was born and raised in Milford, Connecticut and graduated from Southern Connecticut State College in 1963. He played college football at Southern Connecticut State as a quarterback and holds the team record for longest completed pass (87 yards).

Coaching career
Griffin began his coaching career at Holy Cross High School in Queens, NY, leading the team to their first New York City Championship in 1963 and a second New York City Championship in 1965. Griffin worked as an assistant coach at URI from 1966 to 1970. He next was offensive coordinator at Idaho State, and was named head coach in 1972. Griffin returned to URI in 1976 and spent 17 seasons as the Rams' head coach. 

On November 25, 1992, Griffin was fired from his post at Rhode Island.  In the 20 years following Griffin's termination, the school's football team had two winning seasons under four different head coaches.

Personal life
Griffin has three children and seven grandchildren. He currently resides in Narragansett, Rhode Island with his wife, Rosanne.

Head coaching record

References

1940 births
Living people
American football quarterbacks
Idaho State Bengals football coaches
Rhode Island Rams football coaches
Southern Connecticut State Owls football players
High school football coaches in New York (state)
High school football coaches in Rhode Island
People from Milford, Connecticut
People from Narragansett, Rhode Island
Players of American football from Connecticut